Robert Hall Weir (né Parber, born October 16, 1947) is an American musician and songwriter best known as a founding member of the Grateful Dead. After the group disbanded in 1995, Weir performed with The Other Ones, later known as The Dead, together with other former members of the Grateful Dead. Weir also founded and played in several other bands during and after his career with the Grateful Dead, including Kingfish, the Bob Weir Band, Bobby and the Midnites, Scaring the Children, RatDog, and Furthur, which he co-led with former Grateful Dead bassist Phil Lesh. In 2015, Weir, along with former Grateful Dead members Mickey Hart and Bill Kreutzmann, joined with Grammy-winning singer/guitarist John Mayer, bassist Oteil Burbridge, and keyboardist Jeff Chimenti to form the band Dead & Company. The band remains active.

During his career with the Grateful Dead, Weir played mostly rhythm guitar and sang many of the band's rock & roll and country & western songs. In 1994, he was inducted into The Rock and Roll Hall of Fame as a member of the Grateful Dead.

Early life
Weir was born in San Francisco, California, to John (Jack) Parber (1929–2015), of Italian and German ancestry, and a fellow college student, Phyllis Inskeep (1924–1997), of German, Irish, and English ancestry, who later gave him up for adoption; he was raised by his adoptive parents, Frederic Utter Weir and Eleanor ( Cramer) Weir, in Atherton. He began playing guitar at age thirteen after less successful experimentation with the piano and the trumpet. He had trouble in school because of undiagnosed dyslexia and he was expelled from nearly every school he attended, including Menlo School in Atherton and Fountain Valley School in Colorado, where he met future Grateful Dead lyricist John Perry Barlow.

Career
On New Year's Eve 1963, 15-year-old Weir and an underage friend were wandering the back alleys of Palo Alto, looking for a club that would admit them, when they heard banjo music. They followed the music to its source, Dana Morgan's Music Store. They encountered a 21-year-old Jerry Garcia, oblivious to the date, waiting for his students to arrive. Weir and Garcia spent the night playing music together and then decided to form a band. The Beatles significantly influenced their musical direction. "The Beatles were why we turned from a jug band into a rock 'n' roll band," said Bob Weir. "What we saw them doing was impossibly attractive. I couldn't think of anything else more worth doing." Originally called Mother McCree's Uptown Jug Champions, the band was later renamed The Warlocks and eventually the Grateful Dead.

Weir played rhythm guitar and sang a large portion of the lead vocals through all of the Dead's 30-year career. In the fall of 1968, the Dead played some concerts without Weir and Ron "Pigpen" McKernan. These shows, with the band billed as "Mickey and the Hartbeats", were intermixed with full-lineup Grateful Dead concerts. In his biography of Jerry Garcia, Blair Jackson notes, "Garcia and Lesh determined that Weir and Pigpen were not pulling their weight musically in the band…  Most of the band fights at this time were about Bobby's guitar playing." Late in the year, the band relented and took Weir and Pigpen back in full-time.

The incident apparently led to a period of significant growth in Weir's guitar playing.  Phil Lesh said that when drummer Mickey Hart left the band temporarily in early 1971, he was able to hear Weir's playing more clearly than ever and "I found myself astonished, delighted and excited beyond measure at what Bobby was doing." Lesh described Weir's playing as "quirky, whimsical and goofy" and noted his ability to play chord voicings on the guitar (with only four fingers) that one would normally hear from a keyboard (with up to ten fingers).

In the late 1970s, Weir began to experiment with slide guitar techniques and perform certain songs during Dead shows using the slide. His unique guitar style is strongly influenced by the hard bop pianist McCoy Tyner and he has cited artists as diverse as John Coltrane, the Rev. Gary Davis, and Igor Stravinsky as influences.

Weir's first solo album Ace appeared in 1972, with the Grateful Dead performing as the band on the album, though credited individually. Included in this line-up were Keith Godchaux and his wife Donna, both of whom would be in the band by the time of the album's release. A live version of the album's best-known song, "Playing in the Band", had been issued on the Skull & Roses album of the previous year. While continuing to perform as a member of the Grateful Dead, in 1975 and 1976 Weir played in the Bay Area band Kingfish with friends Matt Kelly and Dave Torbert. He later contributed to Kelly's 1987 album A Wing and a Prayer, on Relix Records. In 1978 he fronted the Bob Weir Band with Brent Mydland, who joined the Grateful Dead the following year. In 1980 he formed another side band, Bobby and the Midnites.

Shortly before Garcia's death in 1995, Weir formed another band, RatDog Revue, later shortened to RatDog. In RatDog, Weir performs covers of songs by various artists, including The Beatles, Bob Dylan, Chuck Berry, and Willie Dixon while also performing many Grateful Dead songs. In addition, Ratdog performs many of their own originals, most of which were released on the album Evening Moods. 

Weir has participated in the various reformations of the Grateful Dead's members, including 1998, 2000, and 2002 stints as The Other Ones and in 2003, 2004 and 2009 as The Dead. In 2008 he performed in the two Deadheads for Obama concerts. In 2009 Bob Weir and Phil Lesh formed a new band called Furthur—so-named in honor of Ken Kesey's famous psychedelically-painted bus.

In 2011, Weir founded the Tamalpais Research Institute, also known as TRI Studios.  TRI is a high-tech recording studio and virtual music venue, used to stream live concerts over the internet in high-definition.

In 2012, Weir toured with Chris Robinson of the Black Crowes and singer/songwriter Jackie Greene as the Weir, Robinson, & Greene Acoustic Trio.

Weir resuscitated RatDog in March 2013. The RatDog Quartet, featuring Weir, Jay Lane, Robin Sylvester, and Jonathan Wilson debuted on March 3, at the Sweetwater Music Hall. Jason Crosby was their featured guest at the first two shows.

On April 25, 2013, Weir collapsed onstage during a Furthur performance at the Capitol Theater in Port Chester, New York. The band finished the show without him. He performed with the band two days later in Atlantic City, but on April 29 a representative announced that Weir would be "unable to perform in any capacity for the next several weeks" for unspecified reasons. Weir resumed performing that summer.

On April 23, 2014, The Other One: The Long Strange Trip of Bob Weir premiered at the Tribeca Film Festival directed by Mike Fleiss husband of Miss America 2012, Laura Kaeppeler.

On August 10, 2014, Weir abruptly canceled all of his upcoming appearances, according to The Huffington Post, "The cancellations include all shows for the rest of the year with his band Ratdog, as well as a concert with Furthur". According to Jambase, Ratdog performed without Weir in Las Vegas in July 2014. "A statement from the venue said Weir was 'under the weather'."

In early July 2015, Weir joined the other original living members of the Grateful Dead —Mickey Hart, Bill Kreutzmann, and Phil Lesh — for three shows at Soldier Field in Chicago. These four surviving members (known as the "Core Four") were joined by Jeff Chimenti on keys and Phish's Trey Anastasio on lead guitar and shared vocals, and Bruce Hornsby on piano. The reunion was 20 years nearly to the day since the band's final concert with Jerry Garcia at the same venue in 1995. "Fare Thee Well: Celebrating 50 Years of Grateful Dead" was billed as the original four members' last performance together.  Based on demand, two additional Fare Thee Well concerts were added to the series, performed in late June 2015 at Levi Stadium in California.

On October 5, 2015, Weir performed with Ratdog at a special celebratory 60th Birthday Bash for Steve Kimock. It was the first time Ratdog had performed again since the aforementioned cancellations of his 2014 summer tour.

In late 2015 Weir teamed up with former Grateful Dead bandmates Mickey Hart and Billy Kreutzmann as well as guitarist John Mayer, bassist Oteil Burbridge and keyboardist Jeff Chimenti to form Dead & Company. They played 22 shows starting at the end of October, concluding with a four show New Year's run including two shows in San Francisco and two in Los Angeles, ending with a three set show on New Year's Eve. The band continues to tour regularly.

In May 2016, Weir was a guest speaker and performer for the second annual Einstein Gala, in Toronto, Canada, an event honoring the legacy of Albert Einstein and new visionaries in the arts and sciences. Weir spoke about what science and innovation had meant to him. Weir performed a solo acoustic set, and was joined mid-set by guitarist Dan Kanter. In the same month, Weir also confirmed, in an interview with The Guardian, that he was writing a book.

In 2016, a live recording of Weir performing with The National was included on the massive Day of the Dead. Weir's 2012 collaboration with members of The National as part of The Bridge Session helped pave the way for the Grateful Dead tribute.

In June 2016, at the Bonnaroo Arts And Music Festival, Weir received the first ever Les Paul Spirit Award, from the Les Paul Foundation. "I cannot think of anyone more fitting to be honored with the first annual Les Paul Spirit Award than Bob Weir. Not only is he an extraordinary talent who has given us an amazing array of legendary music, but he is an innovator who understands music, technologies and the spirit of Les Paul," said Michael Braunstein, executive director of the Les Paul Foundation. "If Les were still alive today, I have absolutely no doubt that he and Bob would be experimenting together at TRI Studios or at Les's house and the results would be extraordinary."

Weir received the 2016 Lifetime Achievement Award at the 2016 Americana Honors & Awards in Nashville, TN.

In September 2016, Weir released a new album of "cowboy songs" titled Blue Mountain. The release was followed by a tour beginning in October 2016. The album was inspired by his time working as a ranch hand in Wyoming, when he was fifteen years old.

During the spring of 2018, Weir performed a series of concerts with former Grateful Dead bassist Phil Lesh.  The duo, with guest musicians, was billed as Bobby and Phil.

In 2018 Weir formed a band called Wolf Bros.  Billed as Bob Weir & Wolf Bros, the group initially was a trio, with Weir on guitar and vocals, Don Was on upright bass, and Jay Lane on drums.  They toured the U.S. in the fall of 2018, the spring of 2019, and in early 2020.  In late 2020 and early 2021 the band played several concerts at TRI Studios with Jeff Chimenti on keyboards and Greg Leisz on pedal steel guitar.  After the first of these shows the band also added a horn and string section called the Wolfpack, comprising Brian Switzer on trumpet, Adam Theis on trombone, Sheldon Brown on saxophone, clarinet, and flute, Mads Tolling on violin, and Alex Kelly on cello. In the summer of 2021 this larger ensemble, now billed as Bobby Weir & Wolf Bros, played several concerts in Colorado and California.

Personal life
Weir remained single throughout his years with the Grateful Dead, although he lived for several years (1969–1975) with Frankie Hart. Hart had been a go-go dancer at the Peppermint Lounge in New York, had worked in Apple Records American marketing department, and had performed on the TV shows Hullabaloo and Shindig!. She was allegedly the inspiration for the Robert Hunter-Bob Weir song "Sugar Magnolia".  Weir made her acquaintance through Mickey Hart, who dated her briefly. He met her following her first Grateful Dead show in New York in 1968. Her real name at that time was Frankie Azzara (from a previous marriage), but used the stage name "Frankie Hart" (after apparently "borrowing" Hart's last name). Although she and Weir never married, she adopted his last name after moving in with him and was subsequently known as Frankie Weir.

On July 15, 1999, Weir married Natascha Münter in Mill Valley, California. Together they have two daughters, Shala Monet Weir and Chloe Kaelia Weir. Bob Weir's sister-in law is Leilani Münter, a former race car driver in the ARCA Racing Series circuit. Weir is a long term vegetarian and advocate for animal rights who was influential in the founding of Farm Sanctuary.

Weir is on the board of directors of the Rex Foundation, the Furthur Foundation, and HeadCount. He also is a member of the Advisory Board of the Jerry Garcia Foundation along with Peter Shapiro and Seth Rogin. He is an honorary member of the board of directors of the environmental organization Rainforest Action Network, along with Woody Harrelson, Bonnie Raitt, and John Densmore. He is also on the honorary board of directors of Little Kids Rock, a non-profit organization that provides free musical instruments and instruction to children in under-served public schools throughout the U.S.

Guitars

Early pictures of The Warlocks in concert show him playing a Gretsch Duo-Jet, and after the Warlocks became the Grateful Dead, Weir briefly played a Rickenbacker 365, a Guild Starfire IV semi-hollowbody (with Garcia playing an identical cherry red Starfire IV, which appears very similar to the Gibson ES-335) as well as a Fender Telecaster before settling on a cherry red 1965 Gibson ES-335 as his primary guitar for the following decade. Weir can also be seen playing a sunburst ES-335 in The Grateful Dead Movie, filmed in October 1974. During the early 1970s, Weir also used a Gibson ES-345, a 1961 or 1962 Gibson SG and a black Gibson Les Paul of indeterminate age in 1971.

In 1974, Weir began working with Jeff Hasselberger at Ibanez to develop a custom instrument. Weir began playing the Ibanez 2681 during the recording of Blues for Allah; this was a testbed instrument with sliding pickups that Hasselberger used to develop several additional 2681s for use onstage, as well as Weir's custom "Cowboy Fancy" guitar, which he played from 1976 until the mid-1980s. Weir began using a Modulus Blackknife at that point, and continued to play the Blackknife, along with a hybrid Modulus/Casio guitar for the "Space" segment of Grateful Dead concerts for the rest of that band's history. Weir's acoustic guitars include several Martins, a Guild, an Ovation, and a line of Alvarez-Yairi signature models.

With his post-Grateful Dead bands, Weir has played a Modulus G3FH custom, a Gibson ES-335, and a 1956 Fender Telecaster previously owned by James Louis Parber, his late half-brother.

In August 2016, during a preview of Weir's solo album, Blue Mountain, Weir stated that the only instrument he used during the recording of the album was a Martin acoustic guitar.

From 2017 onwards, Weir has collaborated with New York based D'Angelico Guitars to produce several signature model instruments. The Premier, a semi-hollow guitar, was released in 2017, and the Deluxe Bedford, a solid-body, was released in 2020.

Discography
Grateful Dead and related bands

 Mother McCree's Uptown Jug Champions – Mother McCree's Uptown Jug Champions (1999)
 The Strange Remain – The Other Ones (1999)
 Fare Thee Well: Celebrating 50 Years of the Grateful Dead – Fare Thee Well (2015)

Solo albums
 Ace (1972)
 Heaven Help the Fool (1978)
 Weir Here – The Best of Bob Weir (2004) – compilation 
 Blue Mountain (2016)

Kingfish
 Kingfish (1976)
 Live 'n' Kickin' (1977)
 Kingfish in Concert: King Biscuit Flower Hour (1996)

Bobby and the Midnites
 Bobby and the Midnites (1981)
 Where the Beat Meets the Street  (1984)

Bob Weir and Rob Wasserman
 Live (1998)
 Fall 1989: The Long Island Sound (2013) – also Jerry Garcia Band

RatDog
 Evening Moods (2000)
 Live at Roseland (2001)

Wolf Bros
 Live in Colorado (2022)
 Live in Colorado Vol. 2 (2022)

As a guest musician
 Gathering – Josh Ritter (2017)
 Bear's Sonic Journals: Dawn of the New Riders of the Purple Sage – New Riders of the Purple Sage (2020)

Videos
 Move Me Brightly (2013)
 The Other One: The Long, Strange Trip of Bob Weir (2015)

See also

Notes

References

 Condran, Ed. "Hot Rats", Atlantic City Weekly, July 9, 2009

External links

 The official Bob Weir & RatDog site
 The official Bob Weir site
 Bob Weir collection at the Internet Archive's live music archive
Bob Weir on the Grateful Dead's Official Site

 
1947 births
Living people
American male singer-songwriters
American rock guitarists
American male guitarists
American rock singers
American adoptees
Grateful Dead members
Singers from San Francisco
Rhythm guitarists
Songwriters from San Francisco
Guitarists from San Francisco
American blues guitarists
American folk guitarists
American country guitarists
People from Atherton, California
RatDog members
The Other Ones members
Furthur (band) members
Dead & Company members
Bobby and the Midnites members
Kingfish (band) members
Go Ahead (band) members
20th-century American guitarists
Warner Records artists
Arista Records artists
Columbia Records artists
Singer-songwriters from California